A constitutional referendum was held in Burundi on 18 November 1981. The new constitution would make the country a presidential republic with a unicameral National Assembly, as well as creating a one-party state with the Union for National Progress (UPRONA) as the sole legal party. It was supported by 99.28% of voters with a 94% turnout.

Results

References

1981
1981 referendums
1981 in Burundi
Constitutional referendums